The 2021 Challenger Città di Lugano was a professional tennis tournament played on indoor hard courts. It was the 1st edition of the tournament which was part of the 2021 ATP Challenger Tour. It took place in Lugano, Switzerland between 22 and 28 March 2021.

Singles main-draw entrants

Seeds

 1 Rankings are as of 15 March 2021.

Other entrants
The following players received wildcards into the singles main draw:
  Jérôme Kym
  Leandro Riedi
  Dominic Stricker

The following player received entry into the singles main draw as a special exempt:
  Matthias Bachinger

The following players received entry into the singles main draw as alternates:
  Altuğ Çelikbilek
  Lucas Miedler
  Jack Sock

The following players received entry from the qualifying draw:
  Antoine Bellier
  Francesco Forti
  Vitaliy Sachko
  Tim van Rijthoven

The following players received entry as lucky losers:
  Ryan Peniston
  Jelle Sels

Champions

Singles

 Dominic Stricker def.  Vitaliy Sachko 6–4, 6–2.

Doubles

 Andre Begemann /  Andrea Vavassori def.  Denys Molchanov /  Sergiy Stakhovsky 7–6(13–11), 4–6, [10–8].

References

2021 ATP Challenger Tour
2021 in Swiss tennis
March 2021 sports events in Switzerland